Paul Watson (born 1950) is a Canadian environmental activist, ship's skipper, and founder of the Sea Shepherd Conservation Society.

Paul Watson may also refer to:

 Paul Watson (basketball) (born 1994) American basketball player
 Paul Watson (cyclist) (born 1962), former professional English road racing cyclist
 Paul Watson (documentary filmmaker) (born 1942), English film-maker
 Paul Watson (footballer, born 1975), English football player
 Paul Watson (footballer, born 1990), Scottish football player
 Paul Watson (football manager) (born 1984), British sports journalist and expatriate football coach
 Paul Watson (journalist) (born 1959), Canadian photojournalist and author
 Paul Watson (musician) (born 1952), American cornetist and songwriter
 Paul E. Watson (died 1943), American electrical engineer
 Paul Joseph Watson (born 1982), British right-wing YouTuber, radio host, writer and conspiracy theorist